Nepytia umbrosaria is a moth of the family Geometridae first described by Alpheus Spring Packard in 1873. It is found in North America, including Arizona, British Columbia, California, Oklahoma, Oregon and Washington.

The wingspan is about 33 mm. Adults are on wing from late July to early August.

The larvae feed on the foliage of Abies amabilis, Abies grandis, Pseudotsuga menziesii var. glauca and Tsuga heterophylla. Mature larvae reach a length of about 35 mm. They have a creamy-yellow body, marked with orange middorsal patches and with a light tan head with dark spots. The species overwinters as a mid-instar larva. Larvae feed from April to June. Pupation takes place in June.

Subspecies
Nepytia umbrosaria umbrosaria
Nepytia umbrosaria nigrovenaria (Packard, 1876)

References

Moths described in 1873
Ourapterygini